Dneprovsky Uyezd was one of the subdivisions of the Taurida Governorate of the Russian Empire. It was situated in the northwestern part of the governorate. Its administrative centre was Alyoshki (Oleshky).

Demographics
At the time of the Russian Empire Census of 1897, Dneprovsky Uyezd had a population of 212,241. Of these, 73.6% spoke Ukrainian, 19.9% Russian, 3.0% Yiddish, 1.4% Belarusian, 1.3% German, 0.3% Polish, 0.2% Crimean Tatar, 0.2% Moldovan or Romanian and 0.1% Romani as their native language.

References

 
Uyezds of Taurida Governorate
Taurida Governorate